The battle of La Victoria was a battle of the Venezuelan War of Independence, in which royalist forces under José Tomás Boves tried to take the city of La Victoria, held by General José Félix Ribas.

The battle was fought on 12 February 1814. Given the shortage of regular troops, Ribas had to arm a thousand students from colleges and seminaries in the city and other neighboring towns, including 85 students of the Seminary of Santa Rosa de Lima, Caracas. Before going into battle, General Ribas addressed the youths who accompanied him, ending with these words:

The battle began at seven in the morning and lasted all day on the streets of the city. Republican troops built an impressive resistance to push the royalist troops at that time led by Francisco Tomás Morales. By late afternoon, victory had not yet gone to either side. While the fighting raged, the Patriots received a reinforcement of 220 troopers under Vicente Campo Elías, from San Mateo, that effectively broke the siege. Hours later, Morales and his men withdrew combat horsemen pursued by Republicans. Result of this battle fails realistic attempt to cut communications between Caracas and Valencia.

Bolivar, knowing victory Ribas granted the title of "Winner of the Tyrants".

On 12 February 1947, the Constituent Assembly decreed that Venezuela would celebrate each anniversary of the battle as Youth Day, in honor of the young people who achieved this important victory. In Victoria's main square there is a sculptural group made by Eloy Palacios, erected in 1895, representing Ribas showing a youth how to use a rifle.

References 

History of Venezuela
1814 in Venezuela
La Victoria
February 1814 events